Michael John Addesa, Jr. (January 8, 1945 – November 29, 2022) was an American ice hockey coach and football player. Addesa was the head coach of the Rensselaer Polytechnic Institute men's ice hockey team from 1979 to 1989. Addesa played collegiate football at Holy Cross.

Coaching career 
In 1974, Addesa became an assistant ice hockey coach at Holy Cross.  He was elevated to head coach in 1976 and stayed in that position until the end of the 1978–1979 season, when he was hired by Rensselaer Polytechnic Institute.

Addesa was hired by RPI to replace Jim Salfi who had coached the team from 1972 to 1979.

In his 10 years with RPI, Mike Addesa won one NCAA Division I Men's Ice Hockey Championship in 1985 and two ECAC Division I Men's Ice Hockey Championships in 1984 and 1985.

Addesa was forced to resign as head coach at RPI in 1989 due to philosophical differences, stemming from the controversy over accusations of making racist comments towards one of two black players on his team, one of whom was future NHL player Graeme Townshend: "If you don’t put forth a greater effort, the world will only see you as a stereotypical nigger.” He has apologized for the comments. Townshend accepted the apology, and has voiced 100% support for Addesa from the beginning. Townshend has stated that his relationship with Addesa was unlike any player/coach relationship he had ever experienced, and that Addesa went above and beyond the job of just being a coach. Townshend viewed their relationship as being closer to a father/son thing. "I loved the guy.” Addesa would later go on to say that he had not meant the comments "racially"  and to describe his firing from RPI as a "scam" which had made it impossible for him to continue coaching.

Scouting career 
Addesa worked as a scout for the Detroit Red Wings of the National Hockey League from 1990 to 1995 and the Calgary Flames from 2011 to 2013.
On August 4, 2015, Addesa was named as a scout for the Vancouver Canucks of the National Hockey League.

Personal life and death
Addesa died peacefully, surrounded by loved ones, on November 29, 2022, at the age of 77 from natural causes.

Head coaching record

References

External links

1945 births
2022 deaths
Calgary Flames scouts
Detroit Red Wings scouts
RPI Engineers men's ice hockey coaches
Holy Cross Crusaders football players
Holy Cross Crusaders men's ice hockey coaches
Players of American football from Boston
Sportspeople from Boston